Alpağut is a village in the Keles district of Bursa Province in Turkey.

References

Villages in Keles District